Road to Paradise: Anthology 1978–83 is a compilation album by the English rock band Magnum. It was released in 1998 by Castle Communications. At the time of its release, there had been a number of poorly produced compilations of Magnum's older Jet Records material. This compilation was an attempt to remedy this, including all of the A-sides and B-sides released by Jet Records as well as a selection of material chosen by fans via the Internet.

The album is a collection of tracks selected from Kingdom of Madness, Magnum II,
Marauder, Chase the Dragon and The Eleventh Hour as well as B-sides and EP tracks from 1978 to 1983.

Track listing

Personnel
Tony Clarkin — guitar
Bob Catley — vocals
Wally Lowe — bass guitar
Richard Bailey — keyboards, flute
Kex Gorin — drums
Mark Stanway — keyboards

References

External links
 www.magnumonline.co.uk — Official Magnum site

Albums produced by Leo Lyons
Albums produced by Tony Clarkin
Magnum (band) compilation albums
1998 compilation albums
Albums produced by Jeff Glixman